Tubariomyces is a genus of fungi in the family Inocybaceae. The genus, circumscribed in 2010, contain two species known from Mediterranean Europe and possibly northern Africa.

References

Inocybaceae
Agaricales genera